Government Bangla College is a public college located in the northwest part of the capital city of Dhaka in Bangladesh.The college was established in 1962 by Principal Abul Kashem to promote the use of the Bangla in higher education and to establish the language in all spheres of national life of Bengalis. It is affiliated  with the University of Dhaka.

History

Soon after the historical Language Movement, in 1956 Bangla was recognized as one of the state languages of Pakistan, in the country's first Constitution. Shortly thereafter, Principal Abul Kashem, former professor of University of Dhaka and pioneer of the Bengali Language Movement, realized that Bangla is neglected in every different field in Pakistan. In 1960, in a meeting for Martyrs' Day at Curzon Hall at University of Dhaka, he said “Even before West Pakistan was formed, they had established Urdu Colleges to make Urdu as a State language of Pakistan. The Government of Pakistan has contributed funds and land to Urdu Colleges. Although we have fought so much, the government is still ignoring our plea. If government doesn't respond, we should create a Bangla Medium College in the future.”

In 1961, he started discussions with educationists and intellectuals to set up a Bangla college in then East Pakistan, now Bangladesh. The college was established on October 01, 1962.

The college became affiliated with the University of Dhaka in 2017.

Academic departments

Faculty of Science
 Botany
 Zoology
 Physics
 Chemistry
 Mathematics
 Soil Science
 Geography and Environmental Science

Faculty of Arts and Social Science
 English
 Bangla
 History
 Islamic Studies
 Islamic History and Culture
 Political Science
 Social Work
 Economics

Faculty of Business Studies
 Accounting
 Finance & Banking
 Management
 Marketing

Academic buildings
 Building - 1 (Administrative)
 Building - 2 (Faculty of Arts and Social Sciences)
 Building - 3 (Faculty of Science)
 Building - 4
 Building - 5 (Faculty of Business Studies)
 Building - 6
 Building - 7
 Building - 8

Library
Central library is located in building - 7. With a decorated study room it has a different variety of books. Each department has its library or seminar.

Mosque
Government Bangla College Jame Mosque is located inside the college campus for everyone. There are specific rooms for offering prayer for both boys and girls.

Playground
There's a wide playground in the college campus where cricket, football and different games are played along with hosting annual games.

Transportation
There's a bus called "Bijoy" which takes students from home to campus, campus to home.

Hostel
 Principal Abul Kashem Hostel
 Sheikh Kamal Hostel (under construction)
 Bangabandhu Sheikh Mujibur Rahman Hostel (proposed)
 Sheikh Fazilatunnesa Mujib Hostel (proposed)

Social and cultural organisations
 Bangla College Youth Theatre
 Bangla College Journalists Association
 Bangla College Debating Society
 Bangla College Recitation Society
Bangla College Literature Society
 Bangla College Film and Photography Society
 Bangla College Badhan Unit
 Clean and Green Campus 
 Save The Future Foundation
 Youth Gracious Human

Others
 BNCC (Army, Navy)
 Rover Scout
 Red Crescent
 Bangla College Ranger Unit (Girls Guide)
 Bangladesh Liberation War Stage
 71 er Chetona
 Bangla College Fencing Club
 Bangla College Science Club
 Bangla College English Language Club
 Bangla College Quiz Club
 Bangla College Career Club
 Bangla College Environment Club
 Dainik Adhikar "Bondhumoncho"

See also 
 Bangla College Killing Field
 List of colleges under University of Dhaka

References

External links
 
 Official website
 7 college

Colleges in Dhaka District
Universities and colleges in Dhaka
1962 establishments in East Pakistan
University of Dhaka affiliates